Richard Charles Hoagland (born April 25, 1945), is an American author and a proponent of various conspiracy theories about NASA, lost alien civilizations on the Moon and on Mars and other related topics. Hoagland has been documented to misappropriate others' professional achievements and is widely described as a conspiracy theorist and fringe pseudoscientist.

Background
Hoagland has no education beyond the high school level. According to Hoagland's own curriculum vitae he has no advanced training, schooling or degrees in any scientific field. Hoagland asserts he was a Curator of Astronomy and Space Science at the Springfield Science Museum, 1964–1967, and assistant director at the Gengras Science Center in West Hartford, Connecticut, 1967–1968, and a Science Advisor to CBS News during the Apollo program, 1968–1971. In July 1968, Hoagland filed a copyright registration for a planetarium presentation and show script called The Grand Tour.

A popular planetarium lecturer at the Springfield Science Museum, Hoagland produced a program called "Mars: Infinity to 1965" to coincide with the Mariners 3 and 4 missions. He designed a room with special equipments to display the relative positions of the Earth, Mars and the Mariners during their trip and thereafter contracted with NASA to relay the pictures of the Martian surface, on a near-live-feed, to the general audience. Hoagland co-hosted a radio program for WTIC (AM) in Hartford, Connecticut, The Night of the Encounter, along with Dick Bertel, covering the July 14, 1965 Mariner 4 flyby of the planet Mars. Local newspapers had noted the radio broadcast to be history's first laser audio transmission.

In 1976, Hoagland, an avid Star Trek fan, initiated a letter-writing campaign that successfully persuaded President Gerald Ford to name the first Space Shuttle the Enterprise, replacing the previously slated name for the prototype vehicle, Constitution.

Hoagland authored the book The Monuments of Mars: A City on the Edge of Forever (published in 1987), and co-authored the book Dark Mission: The Secret History of NASA, which was ranked 21st on November 18, 2007, on The New York Times Best Seller list for paperback nonfiction. Richard Grossinger, the founder of North Atlantic Books, writes that Monuments became the most successful title published by North Atlantic, and that at its peak the book sold over 2000 copies per month. Grossinger also reports that Hoagland wrote much of the book while in Los Angeles county jail.

Hoagland ran the now-defunct The Enterprise Mission website, which he described as "an independent NASA watchdog and research group, the Enterprise Mission, attempting to figure out how much of what NASA has found in the solar system over the past 50 years has actually been silently filed out of sight as classified material, and therefore totally unknown to the American people."

Hoagland appeared regularly as the "Science Advisor" for Coast to Coast AM, a late-night radio talk show, until being replaced by Robert Zimmerman in July 2015.

While Hoagland makes frequent reference to his receipt of the "International Angstrom Medal for Excellence in Science" in August 1993, the organization that awarded the medal, The Angstrom Foundation Aktiebolag, founded by Lars-Jonas Ångström, was not authorized by Uppsala University or the Royal Swedish Academy of Sciences to make use of the academy's Anders Jonas Ångström memorial medal. The academy has long authorized only Uppsala University to use their medal for the Ångström's Prize (Ångströms premium), awarded yearly by Uppsala professors to physics students. Mr. Ångström stated in May 2000 that although his award to Hoagland was a mistake, he acted with good faith and with good intentions.

Claims by Hoagland
Hoagland claims the source of a so-called NASA "coverup", with relation to the "Face on Mars" and other related structures, is the result of a report commissioned by NASA authored by the Brookings Institution, the so-called Brookings Report. The 1960 report, entitled "Proposed Studies on the Implications of Peaceful Space Activities for Human Affairs", is claimed by Hoagland, on page 216 of the report, to instruct NASA to deliberately withhold from the public any evidence it may find of extraterrestrial activity, specifically, on the moon, Mars or Venus.

Hoagland has also proposed a form of physics he calls "hyperdimensional physics", which he claims represents a more complete implementation of James Clerk Maxwell's original 20 quaternion equations, instead of the original Maxwell's equations as amended by Oliver Heaviside commonly taught today. These ideas are rejected by the mainstream physics community as unfounded.

Hoagland claims the "Face on Mars" is part of a city built on Cydonia Planitia consisting of very large pyramids and mounds arranged in a geometric pattern. To Hoagland, this is evidence that an advanced civilization might once have existed on Mars. In the years since its discovery, the "face" has been near-universally accepted as an optical illusion, an example of the psychological phenomenon of pareidolia. Similar optical illusions can be found in the geology of Earth; examples include the Old Man of the Mountain, the Pedra da Gávea, and Stac Levenish.

Although the Pioneer 10 plaque was designed entirely by Carl Sagan, Linda Salzman Sagan, and Frank Drake, Hoagland has inaccurately asserted that he co-created the plaque with Eric Burgess. In 1990, Hoagland tried to take credit for the plaque, asserting that "Carl for many years has been taking public credit for the Pioneer plaque which, of course, Eric Burgess and I conceived." Later that year Hoagland went so far as to claim he designed the plaque when he said  "Carl... was involved with Eric Burgess and me in the design of [the] message." Burgess' own account is at odds with Hoagland's design claims, stating that "The design itself was created by Carl Sagan and Frank Drake, with the artistic help of Sagan’s then-wife Linda Salzman Sagan", without mentioning Hoagland at all. Sagan's own correspondence regarding the matter also contradicts Hoagland's claims, specifically saying "he did not contribute one bit of data towards the message design." Burgess recalls similarly, adding that all Hoagland did with regard to the plaque "was support me and say it's a good idea." Hoagland's website still incorrectly credits him as 'co-creator of the "Pioneer Plaque."'

Controversies
In 2011, researcher Andrew Johnson created an in-depth, point-by-point denouncement of Richard Hoagland's "misappropriation" of his and Judy Wood's work in a speech given by Hoagland in Amsterdam on Sunday April 3, 2011. At various points in his nearly three hour lecture, Hoagland presented various theories, research and data originally and previously created by Wood and/or Johnson as his own, with no prior consent given.

At various times, including on the July 2, 2013 Coast to Coast AM broadcast, Hoagland has claimed that the idea to drop a feather and a hammer simultaneously on the moon was his. In fact, the stunt was conceived primarily by Joe Allen, with some help from Dave Scott and Jim Irwin.

On Hoagland's own digital podcast, he claimed on the November 11, 2015 to have coined the phrase, "On the internet nobody knows you're a dog." A simple check of the facts shows that Peter Steiner first published this phrase in a cartoon in the New Yorker published on July 5, 1993.

Responses by scientists
Many scientists have responded to Hoagland's claims and assertions. Professional astronomer Phil Plait described Hoagland as a pseudoscientist and his claims as ridiculous. Plait has also criticized Hoagland for having no university degree. Prof. Ralph Greenberg asserted that the logic of Hoagland's deductions from the geometry of Cydonia Mensae is flawed and says that he is not a trained scientist in any sense. The claim that the crashing of the Galileo orbiter into Jupiter caused a "mysterious black spot" on the planet has since been disputed by both NASA and Plait. There is photographic evidence that a similar "black spot" was present in imagery of Jupiter taken in 1998. A second image referenced by Plait shows a dark ring which looks similar to the spot Hoagland cited. In 1995, Malin Space Science Systems, NASA prime contractor for planetary imaging, published a paper critiquing claims that the "city" at Cydonia is artificial, the claimed mathematical relationships, and — very specifically — denying any claims about concealing questionable data from the public.

In October 1997, Hoagland received the Ig Nobel Prize for Astronomy "for identifying artificial features on the moon and on Mars, including a human face on Mars and ten-mile high buildings on the far side of the moon." The prize is an award given for outlandish or "trivial" contributions to science.

Publications

Books

Contributions, introductions, forewords

Videos

Notes

References

External links
 
 

Hoagload biography sites
 
 

Debunking websites
 
 
 
 
 Exposing PseudoAstronomy Podcast
 Ep 26: Richard C. Hoagland, Part 1 – 19.5°
 Ep 59: The Face on Mars, Part 1
 Ep 60: The Face on Mars, Part 2
 Ep 68: Expat in Hoaglandia: A Fantasia of NASA Conspiracies
 Ep 72: Solar System Mysteries "Solved" by PseudoScience, Part 1 – Iapetus
 Ep 79: Is the Movie "John Carter" a Leak by Those "In the Know?"
 Ep 82: How to Design a Hyperdimensional Physics Experiment – Discusses Hoaglands claims about torsion physics and how to go about testing them.
 Ep 88: Is Phobos Hollow? – Discussion of Richard Hoaglands 2010 claims that the Martian moon, Phobos is hollow.

1945 births
Living people
American conspiracy theorists
People from Albuquerque, New Mexico
People from Morristown, New Jersey
Pseudoscientific physicists